Ray Callahan (born Raymond James Callahan) was a Major League Baseball pitcher. He played with the Cincinnati Reds in 1915.

References

People from Ashland, Wisconsin
Baseball players from Wisconsin
Cincinnati Reds players
Major League Baseball pitchers
1891 births
1973 deaths
Chehalis Gophers players
Chehalis Proteges players
Centralia Pets players
Portland Colts players
Ballard Pippins players
Portland Beavers players
Spokane Indians players
Vancouver Beavers players